"Supper's Ready" is a song by the band Genesis from their 1972 fourth album, Foxtrot. Containing seven sections, it is the band's longest song, almost filling the entire second side of the album's original vinyl release. It has been a fan favourite since its release and has been described as the band's "undisputed masterpiece", with keyboardist Tony Banks referring to part of it as "probably our peak".

In an interview, Peter Gabriel summed up "Supper's Ready" as "a personal journey which ends up walking through scenes from Revelation in the Bible... I'll leave it at that". He was also quoted in the book I Know What I Like by Armando Gallo as saying that the song was influenced by an experience his wife had of sleeping in a purple room, and the nightmares it gave her. 

The band performed the song regularly on stage for several years subsequently. Live versions appear on the albums Live at the Rainbow recorded in 1973, Seconds Out recorded in 1977, the compilation Genesis Archive 1967–75, and the box set Genesis Live 1973–2007. A reworked version also appears on Steve Hackett's 2012 album Genesis Revisited II and its accompanying live albums Genesis Revisited: Live at Hammersmith and Genesis Revisited: Live at Royal Albert Hall.

Structure 
 See below for further details on each section of the song.
Nearly 23 minutes in length, the song is divided into seven sections. A number of musical and lyrical themes re-appear throughout. The melody of the verse in section I reappears as a flute melody between sections II and III. The melody of the chorus in section I reappears with new lyrics in the coda to section VI. The song that comprises the majority of section II reappears briefly in instrumental form at the beginning of section VI, and then returns to form the body of section VII, with new lyrics.

One commentator regarded the structure of "Supper's Ready" as a variation of sonata form—a musicological analysis by Nors Josephson proposes that "section VII may be viewed as a Lisztian, symphonic apotheosis" of the "cyclical fanfares that originated in section II". On the other hand, the individual components of "Supper's Ready" are much closer to traditional rock songs than they are to classical pieces, even if they contain elements of both.

The song undergoes multiple changes in time signature, key signature, Leitmotif, instrumentation, and mood.

Authorship 
The song's writing is credited to the whole band (Banks/Collins/Gabriel/Hackett/Rutherford). In various interviews, Banks mentioned that he composed several of the musical progressions whilst still a university student; Gabriel authored most or all of the lyrical content, as well as the "Willow Farm" section; Collins apparently contributed much to the arrangements and segues from one section to another. In Olivier Lecart's book Genesis, Mike Rutherford hints that he was responsible for the rhythm of "Apocalypse in 9/8".

Sections

I: "Lover's Leap" (0:00 – 3:47) 
This section features a gentle arpeggiated guitar backing (with Hackett, Banks and Rutherford all playing 12-string guitars), soft electric piano (Hohner pianet), bass pedals, cello and flute, and a section with three part vocal harmonies sung by Gabriel and Collins (which omit the third note of the chord). The only percussion played by Collins is triangle, cymbals, and bells.

Lyrically it tells of a man returning home after a long time to be greeted by his lover, and mentions supernatural imagery ("six saintly shrouded men"), which Gabriel claims relate to a genuine spiritual experience which occurred with himself, his wife Jill and producer John Anthony. According to Gabriel, during a late-night conversation, his wife began speaking with a completely different voice. Gabriel held up a makeshift cross out of a candlestick and another household item, and Jill reacted violently; (in Armando Gallo's book, I Know What I Like, Gabriel mentions that his wife had reacted badly to sleeping in a room with purple walls, purple being 'very high in the colour spectrum'). Jill was eventually calmed down and taken to bed, but neither Peter nor John Anthony slept that night. On another occasion, also late at night, Gabriel looked out of the window of his wife's parents' house to see what he perceived to be an entirely different lawn, across which seven shrouded men were walking. Gabriel recounted that these experiences led him to contemplate notions of good, evil, and the supernatural, and eventually inspired the lyrics to "Supper's Ready".

Hackett, however, has a different explanation:  "I believe there’d been some drug taking going on. I believe she [Jill] was having a bad trip at one point, and that Pete and a friend managed to talk her around and get her out of the horrors or whatever it was. So that’s a part of what the song was about, but in a way there’s a kind of redemption implication that goes with that."

In the programme given out at Genesis concerts at the time, "Lover's Leap" was explained as: "In which two lovers are lost in each other's eyes, and found again transformed in the bodies of another male and female."

This segment was performed as part of an acoustic medley on the group's 1998 Calling All Stations tour with Ray Wilson on vocals.

II: "The Guaranteed Eternal Sanctuary Man" (3:48 – 5:43) 
Banks composed the chord progression whilst still at University. The programme describes this section as follows: “The lovers come across a town dominated by two characters; one a benevolent farmer and the other the head of a highly disciplined scientific religion. The latter likes to be known as "The Guaranteed Eternal Sanctuary Man" and claims to contain a secret new ingredient capable of fighting fire." 

When performing the song live, Gabriel would don a "crown of thorns" headpiece at this point. The piece segues into the next with a "Lover's Leap" reprise played by Peter Gabriel on flute.

III: "Ikhnaton and Itsacon and Their Band of Merry Men" (5:44 – 9:42) 
This section is much more dynamic than the previous two, with lively drumming from Collins, an elegiac electric guitar solo played by Hackett, and a lot of interplay between Hackett's guitar and Banks’ organ (including a section with fast organ and guitar arpeggios, Hackett employing guitar tapping). The lyrics refer to a battle of some sort, presumably involving Ikhnaton.

IV: "How Dare I Be So Beautiful?" (9:43 – 11:04) 
This is a slow and gentle section, the only instrumentation being acoustic piano chords, each chord being faded-in on the recording, thus losing the piano's characteristic attack and sounding more like an organ (it was done on Hammond organ live). The title is a catchphrase used by the band's early music-business contact, Jonathan King. The lyrics deal with the aftermath of the preceding battle, and refer to the Greek myth of Narcissus, who turned into a flower.

The programme describes this section as follows: "In which our intrepid heroes investigate the aftermath of the battle and discover a solitary figure, obsessed by his own image. They witness an unusual transmutation, and are pulled into their own reflections in the water."

V: "Willow Farm" (11:05 – 15:36) 

Live in concert, Gabriel would appear in his "flower mask" (by Gabriel's own admission, partly inspired by the BBC children's programme The Flower Pot Men). This section features vaudeville-style sections, the Mellotron Mark II's "combined brass" tape set, sped-up vocals, and musique concrète noises of trains and explosions. Lyrically, it has a Python-esque quality, dealing with elements of the absurd in the English psyche, "there's Winston Churchill, dressed in drag, he used to be a British flag, plastic bag, what a drag!" and numerous elements of word play, boarding schools, and social conformity. The lyrics also reference Foxtrot's cover artwork ("the fox on the rocks") and a song from Nursery Cryme, Genesis' previous album ("The Musical Box").

The programme describes "Willow Farm" as follows: "Climbing out of the pool, they are once again in a different existence. They're right in the middle of a myriad of bright colours, filled with all manner of objects, plants, animals and humans. Life flows freely and everything is mindlessly busy. At random, a whistle blows and every single thing is instantly changed into another."

"Willow Farm" was originally a stand-alone song, with music and lyrics by Gabriel. At one point, while "Supper's Ready" was being written and assembled, Banks or Gabriel had the idea of including "Willow Farm" in the middle of it. Banks commented that this jarring, fast-paced piece prevented "Supper's Ready" from seeming too much like a repeat of their earlier epic "Stagnation".

After the vocal section of "Willow Farm" ends, there is a reflective interlude, not definitely belonging to either "Willow Farm" or the following "Apocalypse In 9/8". It starts with bass pedal, electric guitar, organ and Mellotron drones, then proceeds with soft guitar and flute.

VI: "Apocalypse in 9/8 (Co-Starring the Delicious Talents of Gabble Ratchet)" (15:36 – 20:50) 
At this point, the drums enter, with the rhythm section striking out a pattern using the unusual metre of 9 beats to the bar (expressed as 3+2+4). Banks has said that his approach to writing the solo was to parody the style that Keith Emerson had developed with Emerson, Lake & Palmer. In live performances, during the organ solo, Gabriel would don a bizarre "Magog" outfit with geometrical headdress which can be seen on the cover of the band's Genesis Live (1973) album. "Gabble Ratchet" is a reference to the Hounds of Hell; they are usually portrayed as geese, which explains the sound effect heard during this section (18:48–18:53 on Foxtrot). They are also known as "Gabriel's Hounds". The programme for the 1972/3 tour refers to this section as "co-starring the delicious talents of wild geese".

The programme describes this section as follows: "At one whistle the lovers become seeds in the soil, where they recognise other seeds to be people from the world in which they had originated. While they wait for Spring, they are returned to their old world to see Apocalypse of St John in full progress. The seven trumpeters cause a sensation, the fox keeps throwing sixes, and Pythagoras (a Greek extra) is deliriously happy as he manages to put exactly the right amount of milk and honey on his corn flakes."

This segment was performed as a standalone once in 1978 and on the first leg of the 1986 Invisible Touch Tour as part of the "In the Cage"/"...In That Quiet Earth"/"Supper's Ready" medley.

VII: "As Sure As Eggs Is Eggs (Aching Men's Feet)" (20:51 – 22:54) 
"As Sure As Eggs Is Eggs" is a folklore variation of the logical tautology that "X = X" and in this context is a reference to certainty and faith—being absolutely convinced of the ultimate victory of good over evil and that God and Heaven do indeed exist. "Aching Men's Feet" is a play on "making ends meet". "Apocalypse" segues into this part via a slower section that reprises the lyrics from "Lover's Leap" in combination with the chord progression from "The Guaranteed Eternal Sanctuary Man", backed by a pressed snare drum roll and tubular bells. During live shows, a flash charge would be fired and Gabriel would discard his Magog costume to reveal himself in shining white apparel that glowed when exposed to black light. During one gig, he attempted flying on a Kirby wire, and was nearly strangled. From this point to the end, drums, deep bass pedals and Mellotron brass are present, as are Blakean lyrics which reference The New Jerusalem (The Crystal City of God that is established after the death of the Anti-Christ) and the Second Coming of Christ with reference to the biblical Revelation 19:17: "There's an angel standing in the sun. He cried with a loud voice, saying to all the birds that fly in the sky, Come! Be gathered together to the great supper of God."

After completing the lyrics in this section, Gabriel would pick up and raise an active blacklight tube, holding it near himself, upraised with both hands, as though it were a sword. Gabriel would be the only one lit onstage at this point and would actually appear to be glowing from the combination of blacklight, his reflective white costume and fluorescent makeup. Gabriel considered this effect to be a theatrical way of symbolizing the victory of good/light over evil/darkness.

The piece fades out on overdubbing cascading electric guitar parts. On the original recording this section is in the key of A, but because of Gabriel's inability to properly recreate the vocal performance onstage from either hoarseness or tiredness, the band regularly had to change the key to G.

The programme describes this section as follows: "Above all else an egg is an egg. 'And did those feet ............' making ends meet. Jerusalem = place of peace."

This segment was performed as a standalone twice in 1978 and on the first leg of the 1986 Invisible Touch Tour as part of the "In the Cage"/"...In That Quiet Earth"/"Supper's Ready" medley.

The final song on A Trick of the Tail, entitled "Los Endos", quotes from this segment near the very end. As the band fades out, Collins can be heard singing "there's an angel standing in the sun" twice in succession, followed by "free to get back home" as the last notes disappear. These are the only lyrics heard in the song, which is otherwise instrumental; this quote has generally been omitted from live versions (except for Steve Hackett's Genesis Revisited: Live at the Royal Albert Hall and Genesis Revisited: Live at Hammersmith in 2012).

Musicians 
 Peter Gabriel – lead vocals, flute, bass drum, tambourine, oboe
 Phil Collins – drums, backing vocals, triangle, tubular bells, percussion, whistles
 Tony Banks – Hammond organ, Mellotron, Hohner Pianet, piano, treated piano, 12-string acoustic guitar
 Steve Hackett – electric guitar, 12-string acoustic guitar, classical guitar, guitar effects
 Mike Rutherford – bass, 12-string acoustic guitar, cello, backing vocals, Dewtron "Mister Bassman" bass pedals

References

External links 
 

Genesis (band) songs
1972 songs
Songs written by Peter Gabriel
Songs written by Tony Banks (musician)
Songs written by Phil Collins
Songs written by Steve Hackett
Songs written by Mike Rutherford
Book of Revelation
Songs based on the Bible